Prodip Hazarika is an Asom Gana Parishad politician from Assam. He has been elected in Assam Legislative Assembly election in 1985, 1996, 2006 and 2016 from Amguri constituency.

References 

Living people
Asom Gana Parishad politicians
People from Sivasagar district
Assam MLAs 2016–2021
Assam MLAs 1996–2001
Assam MLAs 1985–1991
Year of birth missing (living people)